Claytonia tuberosa, commonly known as Beringian springbeauty or tuberous springbeauty, is a species of flowering plant in the family Montiaceae. It is a perennial herb indigenous to Alaska, British Columbia, Northwest Territories, and the Yukon of North America, westward to East Asia–Siberia. Its closest relative is probably Claytonia virginica.

References

External links
Flora North America

tuberosa
Plants described in 1819
Flora of North America
Flora of Siberia